San Michele in Borgo is a Roman Catholic church in Pisa, region of Tuscany, Italy.

History
The church, together with monastery (which first belonged to the Benedictines, and, from the 12th century, the Camaldolese) was built in the late 10th to early 11th century outside the walls of the city, over an ancient temple dedicated to Mars.  Both were restored several times in the following ages.

The façade is from the 14th century. The upper part has three order of typically Pisane Gothic loggias. There are three portals, also in Gothic style and withlunettes; the main one is surmounted by a tabernacle with "Madonna and Child" by Lupo di Francesco (the original is in the National Museum of San Matteo in Pisa).

The solemn interior, with a nave and two aisles, houses a Crucifix attributed to Nino Pisano (14th century), paintings by Matteo Rosselli, Baccio Lomi, Aurelio Lomi and Giuseppe Melani, as well as remains of frescoes from the 13th century. Under the pavement is the crypt, probably what remains of a former church.

References

Notes

External links
Official Website of the church of San Michele in Borgo 

Michele in Borgo
11th-century Roman Catholic church buildings in Italy
14th-century Roman Catholic church buildings in Italy
Romanesque architecture in Pisa